Jake Morley (born 1 August 1983) is a British singer-songwriter, based in north London.

Early life
Morley grew up in Mill Hill, London. He learned guitar at an early age and began writing songs whilst at Mill Hill County High School in north west London. After studying law at the University of Nottingham for three years, Morley returned to London and started performing on the London open mic scene.

2008–2009
Morley began recording in 2008, and released of his first EP, This City later the same year. A popular artist on the London circuit, Morley played the MS Calling charity gig at the 100 Club where he met double bassist John Parker (formerly of Nizlopi), drummer Harry Mead and sound engineer Phill Brown (Bob Marley / Talk Talk / Faithless) who recorded and co-produced Morley's debut album. Also in attendance was Calum MacColl (Rokia Traore / Ronan Keating / Eddi Reader) who played guitar on and also co-produced the album.

2010 – Many Fish To Fry
In January 2010 Morley, along with Phill Brown and Calum MacColl, started recording Many Fish To Fry. With recording, mixing and over dubs continuing for a few months. Morley returned to live performances in March.

In April 2010 secured a residency at Ronnie Scott's playing once a month all the way through to December.

Towards the end of 2010, Morley joined forces with Kerry Harvey-Piper, of Red Grape Records who took on the role of being his manager.

2011
Morley's debut album Many Fish To Fry was released in February 2011 on his own independent label. After a short UK tour, Morley held his album launch party at London's Bush Hall, where his performance received much critical acclaim.

In March 2011, Morley's debut single 'Feet Don't Fail Me Now' was played on Dermot O'Leary's Saturday afternoon BBC Radio 2 show,. On 5 May Morley headlined the City Showcase after party at the 100 Club and later performed a live set on Janice Long's show. Janice Long recommended 'Feet Don't Fail Me Now' as the featured live track of the week on Jo Whiley's Radio 2 Live in Concert.

YouTube
Morley's video for 'This City' was included in a Best Guitarist on the Web video created by ITN.

2013–2015
Morley spent more than two years writing and recording his second album, The Manual, which was funded in part by a Pledge Music Campaign. It was produced by Calum MacColl (son of Peggy Seeger and Ewan MacColl and half brother to Kirsty MacColl) and released in September 2015.

Reviews

Luke Haines Power Trio
Morley plays bass guitar in the live band of Luke Haines when the former leader of The Auteurs performs as "The Luke Haines Power Trio".

Discography

Extended plays

Albums

Singles

References

External links

MySpace
Sandwich Emporium Records

1983 births
Living people
British male singer-songwriters
21st-century British singers
21st-century British male singers